Maclurcan is a surname. Notable people with the surname include:

Donald Charles Boulton Maclurcan (1918–1999), Australian architect
Hannah Maclurcan (1860–1936), Australian cook and hotelier
James Maclurcan (born 1985), Australian actor and model